The 1948 Giro di Lombardia, 42nd edition of the race, was held on 24 October 1948 on a total route of 222 km (137.9 mi). It was won for the third consecutive time by Italian Fausto Coppi, who reached the finish line with the time of 5h51 ' 55 "at an average of 37.849 km/h, preceding Adolfo Leoni and Fritz Schär.

127 cyclists took off from Milan and 74 of them completed the race.

General classification

Final general classification

References

Giro di Lombardia
1948 in road cycling
1948 in Italian sport
Giro di Lombardia